SS Philip and Jacob Church, previously referred to as Pip 'n' Jay, is a parish church in central Bristol, England. The church that meets there is now called Central. Its full name since 1934 is St Philip and St Jacob with Emmanuel the Unity, although reference to the original church of St Philip exists in records dating from 1174. Historically the 'Mother church of East Bristol', it serves the area known as The Dings.

The building
St Philip and St Jacob refers to itself as the city's 'oldest place of Christian worship'. The church began as a small priory around AD 900. It was later rebuilt by Robert, 1st Earl of Gloucester, who also built the nearby priory of St James'. All that remains of the original church is the font, although parts of the chancel and tower date from at least the 13th Century. The building was extended during the Middle Ages to include the present-day nave, the pillars of which are actually Victorian additions, possibly by William Armstrong.

The tower contains eight bells dating from 1738 and made by William Bilbie of the Bilbie family.

Around 1860 new plans were submitted by John Bindon, Richard Shackleton Pope and Thomas Shackleton Pope and accepted for the rebuilding of the church.

An extension was also added to the south-east corner of the church during the 1980s, comprising meeting rooms, a kitchen and other facilities. The building is an English Heritage Grade II* listed structure.

Archives
Parish records for St Philip & St Jacob church, Bristol are held at Bristol Archives (Ref. P. St P&J) (online catalogue) including baptism, marriage and burial registers. The archive also includes records of the incumbent, churchwardens, overseer of the poor, parochial church council, charities, schools and vestry plus photographs, deeds, pictures, maps and plans.

Closure threats
During the English civil war the demolition of the church was ordered (along with nearby St Peter's) to prevent its use as a fortress for attacking the city of Bristol. However, reinforcements arriving in the city meant that the building was saved.

In the early 1960s, the church was again threatened with closure, but managed to avoid becoming a potato factory due to the vision and determination of its then-small congregation, who adopted both the motto 'Seek First' (from Matthew Chapter 6, verse 33) and, uniquely, the nickname 'Pip 'n' Jay'.

The church today
Since 1963, St Philip and St Jacob has become one of the leading Evangelical churches in Bristol. In the 1970s it was part of the Charismatic revival in the Church of England. Its vicar was the Revd Canon Malcolm Widdecombe (1937-2010, brother of Conservative MP Ann Widdecombe) from 1974 until his retirement in 2009. He died of metastatic oesophageal cancer on 12 October 2010. His son, the Revd Roger Widdecombe, is an Anglican priest. Today, the church supports and sends out many missionaries.

The church changed its name in 2018 to Central and currently is led by the Revd Tim Silk who has been incumbent at the church since 2011.

The parish has passed Resolution B of the Priests (Ordination of Women) Measure 1993; this means it would not accept a woman as its incumbent.

The parish
St Philip and St Jacob is one of the original parishes of Bristol.  It includes the Old Market area, and extended beyond the original city boundaries to include what are now the Bristol districts of Baptist Mills, Barton Hill, Lawrence Hill, Newtown, Russell Town, St Jude's, St Philips Marsh, The Dings and part of Easton.  A growing population in the 19th century led to the building of ten new churches in the east of the parish, seven of which have now closed.  In 1871 Greenbank Cemetery was opened as a burial place for the whole parish.

The ancient parish lay within the hundred of Barton Regis.

See also
 Grade II* listed buildings in Bristol
 Churches in Bristol

References

External links

 SS Philip & Jacob Church, Bristol

13th-century church buildings in England
Saint Philip and Saint Jacob
Saint Philip and Saint Jacob
Grade II* listed churches in Bristol